The Ven. Francis Ashenhurst (1729–1795) was Archdeacon of Derby from 1689 until 1704.

Ashenhurst was born in Staffordshire. He matriculated from St Mary Hall, Oxford and was ordained in 1661. He held livings at Wootton Wawen and Kingswinford.

Notes

Clergy from Staffordshire
Alumni of St Mary Hall, Oxford
Archdeacons of Derby
17th-century English Anglican priests
18th-century English Anglican priests
1729 births
1795 deaths